{{DISPLAYTITLE:TAST}}

In linguistics, TAST (always written as uppercase T plus uppercase AST in subscript) is an abbreviation for the time of assertion, a secondary temporal reference in establishing tense.

Grammatical tense represents the contrast between two measurements along the timeline of an utterance, with one of those measurements being the time of utterance TUTT (the time at which the actual utterance is made).  TUTT is always the primary point of reference for tense.  There are three additional references to which TUTT can be contrasted:  TAST — the time of assertion, TCOM — the time of completion, and TEVL — the time of evaluation; these are secondary references.  The type used for the secondary reference is determined by aspect and type of utterance.

TAST is the time at which the action of a verb takes place.  It can be a single point in time (in the non-durational aspects) such as in English “I had dinner at 5pm.”  Or, it can be a range of time (in the durational aspects) such as “I was eating dinner from 5 till 7.”

References

Mezhevich, Ilana (2008) Time-Relational Approach to Tense and Mood.
Bybee, Joan (1995) Modality & Grammar in Discourse. Amsterdam, John Benjamins.
Ward, Drew (2009) An Inventory & Discussion of English Futurity.  CALLE

Time in linguistics